Implicit computational complexity (ICC) is a subfield of computational complexity theory that characterizes algorithms by constraints on the way in which they are constructed, without reference to a specific underlying machine model or to explicit bounds on computational resources unlike conventional complexity theory. ICC was developed in the 1990s and employs the techniques of  proof theory, substructural logic, model theory and recursion theory to prove bounds on the expressive power of high-level formal languages. ICC is also concerned with the practical realization of functional programming languages, language tools and type theory that can control the resource usage of programs in a formally verifiable sense.

Computational complexity theory